St Ishmaels or St Ishmael's is a village, parish and community close to the Milford Haven Waterway in Pembrokeshire, Wales. The community comprises most of the parish of St Ishmaels and had a population of 478 at the 2011 census.  The ward includes the communities of Herbrandston, Dale and Marloes and St. Brides. The community was subsequently merged with other communities and only the ward remained with the name St Ishmael's. This covers the entire peninsula with at total population at the 2011 census of 1,405.

The parish church of Saint Ismael is below the village, hidden in a small valley near the Haven. In the Age of the Saints, it may have been the seat of the bishop of the cantref of Rhos. Llanismael was considered one of the principal dioceses of Dyfed under medieval Welsh law, second only to Menevia (modern St Davids). With the Norman conquest, St Ishmaels became part of the Lordship of Haverfordwest. The church is a grade II listed building 

The original Baptist Chapel at nearby Sandy Haven was established in 1812 later moving to Sandy Hill on the eastern approach to the village, in 1877. Aenon Baptist Church, Sandy Hill has a baptistry in the stream. Gravestones in the cemetery have links to family names in St Ishmaels. The chapel is in use for services, weddings and community meetings.

The south, west and east of the parish is bordered by the Haven with numerous important bird and marine life within the Pembrokeshire Coast Path. The north is mainly farmland used for both grazing and arable. Prince Charles's first footsteps on Welsh soil were in 1955 to the south of the village on the beach at Lindsway Bay. The royal yacht was anchored in Dale Roads. The southern point of Lindsway Bay is marked by the Great Castle Head lighthouse now a private residence. The lighthouse was built in 1870, and along with the modern Little Castle Head beacon situated across Longoar Bay, serve as navigation beacons for the Rosslare-Pembroke Dock shipping route.

References

External links
Historical information and sources on GENUKI

Villages in Pembrokeshire
Communities in Pembrokeshire
Milford Haven